Bavaria used the South German gulden (also called 'Florin') as its currency until 1873. Between 1754 and 1837 it was a unit of account, worth  of a Conventionsthaler, used to denominate banknotes but not issued as a coin. The Gulden was worth 50 Conventionskreuzer or 60 Kreuzer Landmünze.

The first Gulden coins were issued in 1837, when Bavaria entered into the South German Monetary Union, setting the Gulden equal to four sevenths of a Prussian Thaler. The Gulden was subdivided into 60 Kreuzer. In 1857, the Gulden was set equal to four sevenths of a Vereinsthaler.

The Gulden was replaced by the Mark at a rate of 1 Mark = 35 Kreuzer.

References

 

Kingdom of Bavaria
Currencies of Germany
Modern obsolete currencies
1873 disestablishments in Bavaria
Coins of the Holy Roman Empire
1754 establishments in the Holy Roman Empire
18th-century establishments in Bavaria